The Capitole de Québec is a Beaux Arts-style theatre in Quebec City, Quebec, Canada. It is located in Old Quebec on Place d'Youville. It was listed on the Répertoire du patrimoine culturel du Québec in 1984, and became a National Historic Site of Canada in 1986.

History
Constructed in 1903 based on plans by American architect Walter S. Painter, it was renovated in 1927 by Thomas W. Lamb. It was closed and abandoned in the late 1980s, and underwent a complete restoration in 1992.

Le Capitole was classified as a historic monument on May 3, 1984. It was designated as a National Historic Site of Canada on November 14, 1986.

References

External links
Théâtre Capitole

Theatres in Quebec
Buildings and structures in Quebec City
Culture of Quebec City
Theatres completed in 1903
National Historic Sites in Quebec
Theatres on the National Historic Sites of Canada register
Heritage buildings of Quebec
Beaux-Arts architecture in Canada
Old Quebec
Thomas W. Lamb buildings